This article contains information about the literary events and publications of the 13th century.

Events

1202 – Leonardo Fibonacci writes Liber Abaci, about the modus Indorum, the Hindu–Arabic numeral system, including the use of zero; it is the first major work in Europe to move away from the use of Roman numerals.
1204 – The Imperial Library of Constantinople is destroyed by Christian knights of the Fourth Crusade and its contents burned or sold.
1211 – Hélinand of Froidmont begins compiling his Chronicon.
1220 – A new shrine built at Canterbury Cathedral in England to house the remains of St Thomas Becket quickly becomes one of Europe's major places of pilgrimage, and the destination of the fictional pilgrims in Geoffrey Chaucer's set of narrative poems The Canterbury Tales, written about 170 years later.
1226: By August – The biographical poem L'histoire de Guillaume le Maréchal, commissioned to commemorate William Marshal, 1st Earl of Pembroke (died 1219), a rare example at this time of a life of a lay person, is completed, probably by a Tourangeau layman called John in the southern Welsh Marches.
1240 – Albert of Stade joins the Franciscan order and begins his chronicle.
1249: September 27 – Chronicler Guillaume de Puylaurens is present at the death of Raymond VII of Toulouse.
1251 – The carving is completed of the Tripitaka Koreana, a collection of Buddhist scriptures recorded on some 81,000 wooden blocks, thought to have been started in 1236.
1258: February 13 – The House of Wisdom in Baghdad is destroyed by forces of the Mongol Empire after the  Siege of Baghdad. The waters of the Tigris are said to have run black with ink from the huge quantities of books flung into it, and red from the blood of the philosophers and scientists killed.
1274: May 1 – In Florence, the nine-year-old Dante Alighieri first sees the eight-year-old Beatrice, his lifelong muse.
1276 – Merton College, Oxford, is first recorded as having a collection of books, making its Library the world's oldest in continuous daily use. During the first century of its existence the books are probably kept in a chest.
1283 – Ram Khamhaeng, ruler of the Sukhothai Kingdom, creates the Thai alphabet (อักษรไทย), according to tradition.
1289 – Library of the Collège de Sorbonne, earliest predecessor of the Bibliothèque de la Sorbonne, is founded in Paris.
1298–1299 – Marco Polo dictates his Travels to Rustichello da Pisa while in prison in Genoa, according to tradition.
1300, Easter – The events of Dante's Divine Comedy take place.

New works
13th century
Huon of Bordeaux
Sagas of Icelanders (Íslendingasögur)
Beatrice of Nazareth – Seven Ways of Holy Love, the earliest prose work in Dutch
Conrad of Saxony – Speculum Beatæ Mariæ Virginis
Śivadāsa – "The five and twenty tales of the genie" (version of the Baital Pachisi)
Zhou Mi – Miscellaneous observations from the year of Guixin (癸辛雜識)
c. 1200
Layamon – Brut
Nibelungenlied
Early 13th century
Ancrene Wisse
Færeyinga saga
Farid al-Din Attar – Mantiqu 't-Tayr (The Conference of the Birds)
Codex Gigas
Le Conte de Poitiers
Gautier de Coincy – Les miracles de Nostre-Dame
Anonymus (notary of Béla III) – Gesta Hungarorum
Guido delle Colonne – Historia destructionis Troiae
Hervarar saga ok Heiðreks (The Saga of Hervar and Heidrek)
Gerbert de Montreuil – Le Roman de la Violette
Raghavanka – Harishchandra Kavya
Jean Renart – Guillaume de Dole
Roi Flore et la belle Jeanne
Wolfram von Eschenbach – Parzival
c. 1203 – Hartmann von Aue – Iwein
1205 – Lancelot-Grail
1205–1234 – Estoire d'Eracles (Old French translation of William of Tyre's Historia)
c. 1208 – Saxo Grammaticus – Gesta Danorum
c. 1210
Herbers – Li romans de Dolopathos (translation of Seven Wise Masters)
Raimon Vidal de Bezaudun – Razós de trobar
Gottfried von Strassburg – Tristan
1210–1225 – Sa'ad al-Din Varavini – Marzban-nama (مرزبان‌نامه)
1212 – Kamo no Chōmei (鴨 長明) – Hōjōki (方丈記, Account of a Ten-Foot-Square Hut)
1214 – Gervase of Tilbury – Otia Imperialia
c. 1215
Bertrand de Bar-sur-Aube – Girard de Vienne
Rumi – Diwan-e Shams-e Tabrizi (masnavi in Persian)
c. 1217–1235 – Andayya – Kabbigara Kava (Poets' Defender)
c. 1217–1263 – Strengleikar, Old Norse translation of the Lais of Marie de France, perhaps (partly) by Brother Robert
1220 – Ibn Hammad – Akhbar muluk bani Ubayd
c. 1220s – Snorri Sturlusson – Prose Edda
c. 1225
Francis of Assisi – Laudes creaturarum or Cantico delle creature (Praise of God's creation), the oldest known Italian poetry
King Horn, the oldest known English verse romance
1225 or 1226 – L'Histoire de Guillaume le Marechal (early example of a political biography, in Norman French)
1227 – Brother Robert – Tristrams saga ok Ísöndar, an Old Norse translation of the Tristan and Iseult legend
c. 1227 – Henry of Latvia – Livonian Chronicle of Henry
c. 1230
La Mort le roi Artu, French prose romance
Guillaume de Lorris – First section of Romance of the Rose
Johannes de Sacrobosco – De sphaera mundi
Snorri Sturlusson – Heimskringla
c. 1230s – Post-Vulgate Cycle
Mainly before 1235 – Henry de Bracton – De Legibus et Consuetudinibus Angliae (The Laws and Customs of England)
c. 1240
Bartholomeus Anglicus – De proprietatibus rerumEgil's SagaJohannes de Garlandia – De Mensurabili MusicaRudolf von Ems – Alexanderromanc. 1240–1250 – Roger Bacon – Summa Grammaticamid-13th century
Black Book of Carmarthen completedDoön de MayenceFranco of Cologne – Ars cantus mensurabilisJean de Mailly – Chronica universalis MettensisOld incidents in the Xuanhe period of the great Song Dynasty (大宋宣和遺事)
c. 1250 – Willem die Madoc maecte – Van den vos Reynaerde1250s – Stephen of Bourbon – De septem donis Spiritus Sanctic. 1250–1266 – Poema de Fernán Gonzálezc. 1250–1282 – Mechthild of Magdeburg – Das fließende Licht der Gottheit (The Flowing Light of Divinity; originally composed in Middle Low German)
1252Calyla e Dymna, translation of the Panchatantra into CastilianJikkunshōAfter 1255 – Epic of Sundiata, in Mandinka oral tradition
1258–1273 – Rumi – Masnavi1259 – Bonaventure – Itinerarium Mentis ad Deum (Journey of the Mind to God)
c. 1259–1265 – Thomas Aquinas – Summa contra Gentilesc. 1259–1266 – Jacobus de Voragine – Golden Legend (Legenda sanctorum)completed 1260 – Minhaj-i-Siraj – Tabaqat-i Nasiric. 1260Le Récit d'un ménestrel de ReimsSa'di – Gulistan, Bustan poets and texts in Persian
1263 – Bonaventure – Life of St. Francis of Assisic. 1263 – Jacob van Maerlant – Der Naturen Bloemec. 1264 – Jacob van Maerlant – De Spieghel Historiael1265Book of Aneirin (written or copied at about this date)Shokukokin Wakashū (続古今和歌集, Collection of Ancient and Modern Times Continued, completed)
c. 1270
Ibn al-Nafis – Theologus AutodidactusJohn of Capua – Directorium Vitae Humanae, translation of the PanchatantraPoetic Edda written in Codex Regius, including Hávamál and Völwpác. 1270–1278 – Witelo – Perspectiva1274
Joseph ben Abraham Gikatilla – Ginnat Egoz (Garden of Nuts)
Bonvesin da la Riva – Libro de le tre scritture (Negra, Rubra, Aurea; Western Lombard)
c. 1275 – Jean de Meun – Second section of Romance of the Roselate 13th century
Amir Khusrow – The Tale of the Four Dervishes (Ghesseh-ye Chahār Darvīsh)Njáls sagac. 1280
Bernard of Besse – Liber de Laudibus Beati FrancisciHeinrich der Vogler – Dietrichs Fluchtc. 1280sHavelok the DaneThe Owl and the Nightingale'Anonymous IV' – Concerning the Measurement of Polyphonic Song 
1283
Ramon Llull – BlanquernaMujū – Shasekishū1288 – Bonvesin da la Riva – De magnalibus urbis Mediolani (On the Marvels of Milan)
1288–1289 – Amir Khusrow – Qiran-us-Sa’dain (Meeting of the Two Auspicious Stars – masnavi)
c. 1290s – "Sir Patrick Spens" (Scottish ballad)
1290–1291
Dnyaneshwar – DnyaneshwariAmir Khusrow – Miftah-ul-Futooh (Key to the Victories – masnavi)
1293 – Dante Alighieri – La Vita Nuova1294 – Amir Khusrow – Ghurratul-Kamal (diwan)
c. 1295 – Mathieu of Boulogne – Liber lamentationum Matheoluli (Book of the Lamentations of Matheolus)
1298
Amir Khusrow – Khamsa-e-NizamiGertrude the Great (begins) – Legatus Memorialis Abundantiae Divinae Pietatis (The Herald of Divine Love)
1299 – Rustichello da Pisa – The Travels of Marco Poloc. 1300Cursor MundiGesta RomanorumThe Interlude of the Student and the Girl (Interludium de clerico et puella)New dramaThe Orphan of Zhao (趙氏孤兒 Zhaoshi guer)

Births
c. 1200 – Matthew Paris, English chronicler and monk (died 1259)
1200 – Rudolf von Ems, German nobleman, knight and poet (d. 1254)
1205 – Tikkana, Telugu poet (died 1288)
1207: September 9 – Rumi, Persian poet (died 1273)
c. 1210 – Henry de Bracton, English cleric and jurist (died c. 1268)
c. 1212 – Ibn Sahl of Seville, poet (died 1251)
1214 – Sturla Þórðarson, Icelandic writer of sagas and politician (died 1284)
1225: January 28 – Thomas Aquinas, Italian philosopher and theologian (died 1274)
c. 1230–1240 – Jacob van Maerlant, Flemish poet and writer in Middle Dutch (died c. 1288–1300)
1240 or 1241 – Mechtilde, German religious writer and saint (died 1298)
1248 – Angela of Foligno Italian mystic and saint (died 1309)
1265 – Dante Alighieri, Italian poet (died 1321)
1266 (probable) – Duns Scotus, Scottish philosopher and theologian (died 1308)
1275 – Dnyaneshwar, Maharashtrian sant and writer (died 1296)
1279 – Muktabai, Maharashtrian sant and Abhang poet (died 1297)
c. 1280 – Ranulf Higden, English chronicler and Benedictine monk (died 1364)
1283 (approximate)
Juan Ruiz, Archpriest of Hita, Castilian poet (died c. 1350)
Yoshida Kenkō (吉田 兼好), Japanese author and Buddhist monk (died c. 1350)
1287: January 24 – Richard de Bury, English bishop and bibliophile (died 1345)
1293 or 1294 – John of Ruysbroeck (Jan van Ruysbroeck), Flemish mystic (died 1381)Unknown year – Thomas the Rhymer, Scottish laird and prophet

Deaths
Unknown – Palkuriki Somanatha, Telugu, Kannada and Sanskrit poet
1209
Nizami Ganjavi, Seljuk Empire Persian romantic epic poet (born c. 1141)
December 29 – Lu You, Chinese poet (born 1125) 
c. 1210 – Gottfried von Strassburg, German writer
1212 – Adam of Dryburgh, Anglo-Scots theologian (born c. 1140)
1223 – Gerald of Wales, Cambro-Norman churchman and topographer (born c. 1146)
1228 (probable) – Gervase of Tilbury, English lawyer, statesman and writer (born c. 1150)
1241: September 23 – Snorri Sturluson, Icelandic historian, poet, and politician (born 1179)
1241: September 26 – Fujiwara no Teika (藤原定家), Japanese waka poet, calligrapher, novelist, and scholar (born 1162)
1251
Ibn Sahl of Seville, poet (born c. 1212)
(probable) – Albertanus of Brescia, Latin prose writer (born c. 1195)
1252 (probable) – Alberic of Trois-Fontaines, Cistercian chronicler
1253: October 9 – Robert Grosseteste, English churchman and scholar (born c. 1175)
1259: June – Matthew Paris, English chronicler and monk (born c. 1200)
1268 – Henry de Bracton, English writer and jurist (born c. 1210)
1273: December 17 – Rumi, Persian poet (born 1207)
1274
March 7 – Thomas Aquinas, Italian philosopher and theologian (born 1225)
July 12 – Bonaventure, philosopher and theologian
1285 – Rutebeuf, French trouvère'' (probable; born c. 1245)
1287: August 31 – Konrad von Würzburg, German poet
1294
Roger Bacon, English scholar (born c. 1214)
Guittone d'Arezzo, Tuscan poet (born c. 1235)
1298: July 13 or 16: Jacobus de Voragine, archbishop of Genoa and chronicler (born c. 1230)

See also
 13th century in poetry
 12th century in literature
 14th century in literature
 List of years in literature

References

 
Medieval literature
History of literature